Terminalia kangeanensis is a species of plant in the Combretaceae family. It is a tree endemic to Java in Indonesia.

References

kangeanensis
Endemic flora of Java
Vulnerable plants
Taxonomy articles created by Polbot